Thaulow is a surname shared by several notable people:

 Carl Thaulow (1875–1942), Norwegian Olympic sailor
 Frits Thaulow (1847–1906), Norwegian impressionist painter
 Harald Thaulow (1815–1881), Norwegian pharmacist
 Heinrich Arnold Thaulow (1808–1894), Norwegian physician
 Johan Fredrik Thaulow (1840–1912), Norwegian physician
 Moritz Christian Julius Thaulow (1812–1850), Norwegian chemist 
 Sven Thaulow (1905–1967), Norwegian Olympic swimmer

Norwegian-language surnames